This article details the fixtures and results of the Myanmar national football team in 2010s.

Results and upcoming fixtures

2010

unofficial matches

2011

2012

2013

2014

2015

2016

2017

2018

2019

 1 : Non FIFA 'A' international match

Notes

References

2010s in Burmese sport
2010